A photoinitiator is a molecule that creates reactive species (free radicals, cations or anions) when exposed to radiation (UV or visible). Synthetic photoinitiators are key components in photopolymers (for example, photo-curable coatings, adhesives and dental restoratives).

Some small molecules in the atmosphere can also act as photoinitiators by decomposing to give free radicals (in photochemical smog). For instance, nitrogen dioxide (NO2) is produced in large quantities by gasoline-burning internal combustion engines. NO2 in the troposphere gives smog its brown coloration and catalyzes production of toxic ground-level ozone (O3). Molecular oxygen (O2) also serves as a photoinitiator in the stratosphere, breaking down into atomic oxygen and combining with O2 in order to form the ozone in the ozone layer.

Reactions

Photoinitators can create reactive species by different pathways including photodissociation and electron transfer. As an example of dissociation, hydrogen peroxide can undergo homolytic cleavage, with the O-O bond cleaving to form two hydroxyl radicals.

H2O2 → 2 ·OH

Certain azo compounds (such as azobisisobutyronitrile), can also photolytically cleave, forming two alkyl radicals and nitrogen gas:

RCH2-N=N-H2CR → 2 RCH2 + N2

These free radicals can now promote other reactions.

Atmospheric photoinitiators

Peroxides

Since molecular oxygen can abstract H atoms from certain radicals, the HOO· radical is easily created. This particular radical can further abstract H atoms, creating H2O2, or hydrogen peroxide; peroxides can further cleave photolytically into two hydroxyl radicals. More commonly, HOO can react with free oxygen atoms to yield a hydroxyl radical (·OH) and oxygen gas. In both cases, the ·OH radicals formed can serve to oxidize organic compounds in the atmosphere.

H2O2 → 2 ·OH
HOO· + O → O2 + ·OH

·OH + CH4 → ·CH3 + H2O

Nitrogen dioxide

Nitrogen dioxide can also be photolytically cleaved by photons of wavelength less than 400 nm producing atomic oxygen and nitric oxide.

NO2 → NO + O

Atomic oxygen is a highly reactive species, and can abstract a H atom from anything, including water.

O + H2O → 2 ·OH

Nitrogen dioxide can be regenerated through a reaction between certain peroxy-containing radicals and NO.

ROO· + NO → NO2 + RO·

Molecular oxygen

In the stratosphere, molecular oxygen (O2) is an important photoinitiator that begins the ozone-production process in the ozone layer. Oxygen can be photolyzed into atomic oxygen by light with wavelength less than 240 nm.

O2 → 2O

Atomic oxygen can then combine with more molecular oxygen to form ozone.

O + O2 → O3

However, ozone can also be photolyzed back into O and O2.

O3 → O + O2

Furthermore, atomic oxygen and ozone can combine into O2.

O + O3 → 2 O2

This set of reactions govern the production of ozone and can be combined to calculate its equilibrium concentration.

Commercial photoinitiators and uses

AIBN

Azobisisobutyronitrile is a white powder often not used as a photoinitiator for vinyl-based polymers such as polyvinyl chloride,  also known as PVC. Because this particular photoinitiator produces nitrogen gas (N2) upon decomposition, it is often used as a blowing agent to change the shape and/or texture of plastics.

Benzoyl peroxide

Benzoyl peroxide, much like azobisisobutyronitrile, is a white powder used as a photoinitiator in various commercial and industrial processes, including plastics production. Unlike AIBN, however, benzoyl peroxide produces oxygen gas upon decomposing, giving this compound a host of medical uses as well.

Upon contact with the skin, benzoyl peroxide breaks down, producing oxygen gas, among other things. The oxygen gas is absorbed into the pores of the skin, where it kills off the acne-causing bacterium Cutibacterium acnes.

In addition, the free radicals produced can break down dead skin cells. Clearing out these dead cells prevents pore blockage and, by extension, acne breakouts.

2,2-Dimethoxy-2-phenylacetophenone

Camphorquinone

Camphorquinone (CQ) is a photosensitiser used with an amine system, that generates primary radicals with light irradiation. These free electron then attack the double bonds of resin monomers resulting in polymerization. The physical properties of the cured resins are affected by the generation of primary radicals during the initial stage of polymerization.

See also
Radical initiator

References

Bibliography

Air pollution
Atmospheric chemistry